Mark Janicello (born November 3, 1962, in Brooklyn, New York) is an American singer, actor, painter, writer, producer and author.

Early life 
Mark Janicello was born on November 3, 1962 in Brooklyn, New York,  the second of three brothers. His mother, Rose Tubiolo Janicello, is a gospel singer, composer, and pianist from Queens, New York of Italian descent. His father David Janicello, is an American, also of Italian heritage. He was an electronic engineer for Photocircuits Corporation abruptly changing careers in 1969 to open one of the three original branches of Colfax Furniture. Both of Janicello's parents attended seminary and became ordained ministers in the Pentecostal branch of Christianity.  The family moved to Burlington, North Carolina when Janicello was six years old.  He attended the University of North Carolina at Greensboro, earning a Bachelor's degree in 1984.

Performing career
Janicello began his career by singing in the subways of New York City in the mid-1980s as part of the MTA's Music Under New York program. Janicello's operatic debut was as Cassio in Verdi's Otello. Caliph in Kismet and Leicester in the American premiere production of Rossini's opera Elisabetta, regina d'Inghilterra, followed. Both productions were directed by Donald Westwood for Opera Northeast. In 1988, Janicello made his west coast debut playing Raoul de Gardefeu in Opera at the Academy's co-production (with Long Beach Opera) of "La Vie Parisienne" directed by Christopher Alden.  In the late1980's, Janicello began performing with the charitable foundation Music for All Seasons,  singing in children's hospitals, prisons and old age homes.

Concurrent with his stage career, Janicello continued to sing in the NY Subways.  In 1990, conductor Eve Queler heard Janicello singing arias in Manhattan's Grand Central Terminal.  She subsequently engaged him to perform in Donizetti's Roberto Devereux, with which he made his Carnegie Hall debut.  Diverse operatic roles followed in productions throughout the United States and Europe.  Janicello also performed for two seasons with the comedic opera troupe La Gran Scena Opera.  In 1996 Janicello sang the world-premiere of the opera "Nuit des Hommes" by Per Nørgård.  In 1995, Janicello had sung Nørgård's opera "Die göttliche Kirmes" in St. Gallen, Switzerland.

He played Camille, Count de Roussillon in the Paper Mill Playhouse Production of Lehár's Die lustige Witwe. He returned to Die lustige Witwe in 2010, this time playing Count Danilo Danilovitsch with the Wiener Operettensommer.  Other operetta roles have included, Alfred in "Die Fledermaus," the title role in Der Zarewitsch and Hans in Die verkaufte Braut.

In 1992, Janicello was named the winner of the KFC Musical Feast, a nationwide search by Kentucky Fried Chicken for the best street performer in America.  He was awarded $15,000.00 by head judge Bo Diddley and appeared with him on NBC's Today show among many other media appearances.

Stadttheater Klagenfurt hired Janicello to play Elvis Presley in their 1997 production, Elvis: A Musical Biography. The musical moved from Klagenfurt to Metropol Theater in Vienna and subsequently toured throughout Germany and Austria.

In October 2012, he co-starred in the Broadway-style musical Loving the Silent Tears, directed by Vincent Paterson, alongside Jody Watley, Jon Secada, Liz Callaway, Debbie Gravitte, Kiril Kulish, Flo Ankah and Patti Cohenour.  He also appears on the musical's cast album.  The Musical is based on the poetry of Supreme Master Ching Hai, a Vietnamese spiritual leader and advocate for veganism.  Janicello has been vegan since 2004 and advocates publicly for a plant-based lifestyle.

In 2021, Janicello provided the German narration for the documentary film Eating Our Way To Extinction, replacing Kate Winslet's English narration for German-speaking Europe.

Musical Librettist and Playwright
Janicello's first work as Musical Author was The Chamelon Concert.  A highly-choreographed mix of operatic arias, Broadway hits, original compositions and songs made famous by Elvis Presley, The Chameleon Concert's book contained personal anecdotes and dramatic monologues written by Janicello.  The show celebrated its world premiere in September 1998 in Vienna's Theater AKzent.

In 1999, Janicello wrote the script for Be My Love: The Mario Lanza Musical which celebrated its world premiere in Theater AKzent on October 7, 1999,  the 40th anniversary of Lanza's death.   Be My Love was a jukebox musical whose score contained popular Italian Folk Songs, well-known operatic arias and a number of Lanza's hit songs.

In 2001, Janicello authored the book and worked as co-lyricist with Rolf Rettburg on his first completely original musical, Charlie: A New Musical.  Charlie's music was composed by Béla Fischer.   Charlie celebrated its world premiere in a German-language version in Vienna's Cabaret Stadnikow in March 2001.  In 2004, an English-language version of Charlie was produced at Het Werkteater in Amsterdam, with additional songs by Kai Peterson.

Cloud Nine is an original children's musical written in 2010 by Mark Janicello (book and lyrics) and the Swedish Actor/Musician Josef Törner.  Originally conceived as a stage production, Cloud 9 is now in pre-production to be made into a 60-minute animated musical for television.

In Spring 2022, Janicello was commissioned by Alok Ruia to write a new play Take The Bins Out, a 75-minute monologue for a visually-impaired actor.

The Finellis 
In 2016, Janicello began work as author, executive producer, co-director, lyricist and leading actor on the Award-Winning Comedy The Finellis. Originally planned to be a television series, a proof-of-concept Episode of The Finellis was a featured presentation at the 2016 Berlin Serienale.  In January 2019, The Finellis went back into production in Berlin with some new cast members and rewritten scripts.  In August 2021, The Finellis went back into production, new cast members were added, and a new storyline was filmed which allowed the filmed material from 2019 and 2021 to be turned into a 90-minute film. "The Finellis Movie" which was released internationally on January 18, 2022.

The Finellis - Awards and Nominations 
In the 2019-2020 Awards Season, The Finellis in its SitCom iteration and Janicello's work on the project were nominated for, and won numerous prizes at international Film- and TV- Festivals.

Author, Columnist and Critic 
Janicello's autobiography Naked in the Spotlight: My Life with Sex, Singing and Scientology was published in a German translation ("Nackt im Rampenlicht") in April 2011 by Ibera Publishers of Vienna.  The English version of "Naked in the Spotlight" was published in 2016.

In 2012, Janicello was engaged to write 6 articles about the marketing of art and artists for Hoop Doop Magazine.  Since 2018, Janicello has worked as critic-at-large for BroadwayWorld.com reviewing stage productions in Berlin, northern Germany and London.

Other Awards 

 1988 - Janicello was awarded a $4,000 scholarship by The Licia Albanese Puccini Foundation. In addition to the cash prize, he was awarded singing lessons with operatic tenor Franco Corelli.
 1992 - Janicello won the $15,000 Grand Prize in the KFC Musical Feast and was named "The Best Street Performer" in America. 
 2016 - Janicello was awarded the Fips Fleischer Music Prize by the City of Leipzig Germany for his many years of performances in that city  He was awarded the prize by the Mayor of Leipzig Heiko Rosenthal.
 2022 - Janicello was awarded as "Best Gospel Elvis"  at the Porthcawl Elvis Festival in Porthcawl, Wales, which is said to be the "largest Elvis Festival in the world."

Discography 

 "Unchained“ (1995) - Promotional CD
 "Crossing Brooklyn Ferry“ (1996) - (UK ONLY) World-Premiere recording of Graham Todd's Oratorio based on Walt Whitman's Poetry
 “Suspicious Minds” (1996) - Promotional CD 
 “Will You Still Be There" (1997) - CD Single - Unreleased Elvis Presley song written by Ben Weisman
 "Can't Help Falling In Love" (1997) - EP from "Elvis: A Musical Biography" 
 "Du bist das Herz der Welt" (1998) - Schlager duet Hanne Haller
 "Be My Love: Das Mario Lanza Musical" (1999) - Original Cast Musical CD 
 “Classics” (1999)  - Puccini and Verdi Tenor Arias  
 "Deep In Your Soul" (2000) - CD Single
 “Time Stands Still” (2000) - CD Single 
 "Charlie: A New Musical" (2001) - German-language Original Cast CD 
 "Right Now" (2001) - CD Single from the Musical "Charlie"
 "Amazing Grace" (2001) - Gospel Classics 
 "Endless Love" (2001) - LIVE in Concert 
 “Elvis: die Show, sein Leben” (2002) - Original Cast CD
 “Rubbernecking” - CD Single - Live at Deutsches Theater Munich
 “Great Big Mama” (2002) - CD Single
 “I Can't Make You Love me” (2003) -  (EP)
 “The Christmas Songs” (2003) - (EP) 
 "Charlie: A New Musical" (2004)  - English-Language Original Cast CD
 "Musical Man” (2005) - Best of Broadway 
 "Butterfly" (2005) 
 "Traummelodien" (2005)  - German, French and Italian Opera and Operetta Arias
 “Georgia On My Mind" (2005) - A Tribute to Ray Charles
 “Traummelodien 2” (2006) - More Opera and Operetta Arias
 “Elvis Goes Classic: LIVE” (2006) - Recorded in Komödie im Bayerischen Hof
 “Die Nacht der Musicals" (2007) - Original Cast Album
 "La Notte Italiana" (2008) - Italian folk, pop and light classics
 "Listen" (2008) - (EP) 
 “Great Big Mama” (2009) - Double Dutch Remix CD Single
 “The Ultimate Collection: The Love Songs” (2009) - Compilation CD
 “Elvis & Me” (2009) - Double CD Set
 "Push it Now' (2011) - CD-Single (sold with Janicello's Autobiography "Naked in the Spotlight" - 1st Edition) 
 “Loving The Silent Tears” (2012) - Original Cast Album
 “Musical Man 2” (2013) - Broadway's Greatest Hits Part 2
 “I Am A Man” (2014) - CD Single
 “Rock Legends” (2017)
 “I Believe" (2017) - Gospel Classics 2 
 “Here I Am Again (2019) CD Single from "The Finellis"
 "The Finellis Movie" - (2021) Original Motion Picture Soundtrack

References

External links

 
 
 The Finellis Official Website
 Marjan Content Productions website

1962 births
Living people
20th-century American male actors
21st-century American male actors
20th-century American painters
21st-century American painters
21st-century male artists
20th-century American dramatists and playwrights
American people of Italian descent
American male singers
American operatic tenors
American male painters
American former Scientologists
American columnists
Latin-language singers
Italian-language singers
Opera crossover singers
French-language singers of the United States
Writers from New York (state)
American male musical theatre actors
American male television actors
American film producers
American male non-fiction writers
University of North Carolina alumni